is a railway station in Iwakuni, Yamaguchi Prefecture, Japan, operated by West Japan Railway Company (JR West).

Lines
Iwakuni Station is served by the Sanyō Main Line and the Gantoku Line. Additionally, trains from the Nishikigawa Seiryū Line inter-run over the Gantoku Line and terminate at Iwakuni.

See also
 List of railway stations in Japan

External links

  

Railway stations in Japan opened in 1898
Railway stations in Yamaguchi Prefecture
Sanyō Main Line